André Ngongang Ouandji (1936 in Bamena, Ndé department, West Province, Cameroon – 27 June 2007 in Brussels, Belgium) was a Cameroonian politician and diplomat.

Until his death he was the Ambassador Extraordinary and Plenipotentiary of the Republic of Cameroon to the Russian Federation. He has 7 children, as well as 11 grandchildren.

References 

Ambassadors of Cameroon to Russia
Cameroonian politicians
2007 deaths
1936 births